Sheila Ryan (born Katherine Elizabeth McLaughlin, June 8, 1921 – November 4, 1975) was an American actress who appeared in more than 60 movies.

Career
Born in Topeka, Kansas, Ryan went to Hollywood in 1939 at the age of 18. Her acting career began when she tried out for a role on a program at television station W6XAO (later KCBS) in Los Angeles, California. An article in a contemporary magazine reported, "She proved to be a perfect television type and was given a role at once."

At age 19, Ryan was selected by a group of Hollywood directors as one of 13 "baby stars of 1940." She was signed by 20th Century Fox in 1940 and was credited in her early films as Bettie McLaughlin. Adopting the name Sheila Ryan, she starred in the crime drama Dressed to Kill the following year. 

Ryan appeared in other memorable films, including two Laurel and Hardy movies, Great Guns (1941) and A-Haunting We Will Go (1942), and the Busby Berkeley musical The Gang's All Here (1943). Ryan also was featured in several Charlie Chan and Michael Shayne mysteries. By the late 1940s, however, her career waned and she began appearing mostly in B movies, especially low-budget westerns. 

She worked with Gene Autry, co-starring in several of his films, including The Cowboys and the Indians (1949), and Mule Train (1950) as well as with Roy Rogers in films like Song of Texas.

She also had roles in several television shows such as The Lone Ranger, notably the Pete-and-Pedro episode (#7 in 1949) and another entitled "The Whimsical Bandit" in 1950.

Ryan retired from acting in 1968.

Physical characteristics
Ryan had brown hair, was 5 feet, 2 inches tall, and weighed 107 pounds. A 1940 newspaper story included her in a group of actresses "whose alluring curves alone might have disqualified them from screen careers not so long ago," in the words of Travis Banton, a Hollywood stylist.

Personal life
Ryan married actor Allan Lane in 1945, but divorced him a year later. Later, she and actor Eddie Norris married, but they had problems in 1948.

While working with Autry, Ryan met actor Pat Buttram. They married in 1952 and remained together until her death in 1975. They had a daughter, Kathleen Buttram, nicknamed Kerry.

Ryan died November 4, 1975, in the Motion Picture Hospital in Woodland Hills, California from lung disease. She was 54 years old. Their daughter Kerry Buttram-Galgano died of cancer in 2007.

Partial filmography

 What a Life (1939) - Jessie
 The Farmer's Daughter (1940) - Dorinda
 Those Were the Days! (1940) - Miss Claire (uncredited)
 The Way of All Flesh (1940) - Mitzi Kriza
 Queen of the Mob (1940) - Party Girl
 I Want a Divorce (1940) - Waitress (uncredited)
 The Gay Caballero (1940) - Susan Wetherby
 Dancing on a Dime (1940) - Brunette (uncredited)
 Life with Henry (1940) - Minor Role (uncredited)
 A Night at Earl Carroll's (1940) - Miss Borgia
 Golden Hoofs (1941) - Gwen
 The Mad Doctor (1941) - Hostess at Charity Bazaar (uncredited)
 Dead Men Tell (1941) - Kate Ransome
 Dressed to Kill (1941) - Connie Earle
 Sun Valley Serenade (1941) - Phone Operator (uncredited)
 We Go Fast (1941) - Diana Hempstead
 Great Guns (1941) - Ginger Hammond
 Pardon My Stripes (1942) - Ruth Stevens
 Lone Star Ranger (1942) - Barbara Longstreth
 Who Is Hope Schuyler? (1942) - Lee Dale
 Footlight Serenade (1942) - Ann, Cowgirl in Movie (uncredited)
 A-Haunting We Will Go (1942) - Margo
 Careful, Soft Shoulders (1942) - Agatha Mather
 Song of Texas (1943) - Sue Bennett
 The Gang's All Here (1943) - Vivian Potter
 Ladies of Washington (1944) - Jerry Dailey
 Something for the Boys (1944) - Melanie Walker
 The Caribbean Mystery (1945) - Mrs. Jean Gilbert
 Getting Gertie's Garter (1945) - Patty Ford
 Deadline for Murder (1946) - Vivian Mason
 Slightly Scandalous (1946) - Christine Wright
 The Lone Wolf in Mexico (1947) - Sharon Montgomery
 The Big Fix (1947) - Lillian
 Heartaches (1947) - Toni Wentworth
 Philo Vance's Secret Mission (1947) - Mona Bannister
 Railroaded! (1947) - Rosie Ryan
 Caged Fury (1948) - Kit Warren
 The Cobra Strikes (1948) - Dale Cameron
 Hideout (1949) - Edie Hanson
 Ringside (1949) - Janet 'J.L.' Brannigan
 Joe Palooka in the Counterpunch (1949) - Myra Madison
 The Cowboy and the Indians (1949) - Doctor Nan
 Mule Train (1950) -  Carol Bannister
 Western Pacific Agent (1950) - Martha Stuart
 Square Dance Katy (1950) - Vicky Doran
 Fingerprints Don't Lie (1951) - Carolyn Palmer
 Mask of the Dragon (1951) - Ginny O'Donnell
 Gold Raiders (1951) - Laura
 Jungle Manhunt (1951) - Anne Lawrence
 On Top of Old Smoky (1953) - Lila
 Pack Train (1953) - Lola Riker
 Street of Darkness (1958) - Carmen Flores (final film role)

References

External links

 
 
 
 B-Western Ladies, Shiela Ryan

1921 births
1975 deaths
Actresses from Kansas
American film actresses
American television actresses
Deaths from lung cancer
Actors from Topeka, Kansas
20th Century Studios contract players
20th-century American actresses